Khasru may refer to:

Abdul Matin Khasru (1950–2021), Bangladeshi lawyer and politician
Amir Khasru Mahmud Chowdhury, Bangladeshi politician and government minister
Ashraf Ali Khan Khasru, Bangladesh politician
Muhammad Khasru (1946–2019), Bangladeshi journalist and activist